The men's coxed four was one of the competitions in the Rowing at the 1900 Summer Olympics events in Paris. The competition was plagued by controversy involving which boats should advance to the final. In one of the most unusual decisions in Olympic history, two separate finals were held for the event, each of which is still considered an Olympic championship by the International Olympic Committee. The crews of all six boats to compete in the two finals are Olympic medallists.

The coxed four event was held from 25 to 26 August 1900. Ten boats, involving fifty-one rowers from four nations, competed. The first final, featuring the three fastest losers from the semifinals, was won by a crew from the Cercle de l'Aviron Roubaix club of France, with another French crew (Club Nautique de Lyon) coming second and German team Favorite Hammonia third. The second final, featuring the semifinal winners, was won by Der Hamburger und Germania Ruder Club of Germany, with Dutch side Minerva Amsterdam finishing second and German crew Ludwigshafener Ruderverein third.

Background

This was the first appearance of the event. Rowing had been on the programme in 1896 but was cancelled due to bad weather. The coxed four was one of the four initial events introduced in 1900. It was not held in 1904 or 1908, but was held at every Games from 1912 to 1992 when it (along with the men's coxed pair) was replaced with the men's lightweight double sculls and men's lightweight coxless four.

Competition format

The coxed four event featured five-person boats, with four rowers and a coxswain. It was a sweep rowing event, with the rowers each having one oar (and thus each rowing on one side). The tournament featured two rounds: semifinals and a final. There were three semifinals, each with three or four boats. 

The original format provided for the three semifinal winners, plus the second-place boat in the third semifinal (with four competitors), advancing to the final. In other words, the last two boats in each semifinal would be eliminated.

The distance for each race was 1750 metres, rather than the 2000 metres which was becoming standard even at the time (and has been used in the Olympics since 1912, except in 1948).

Controversy

After the runner-up in the second semifinal and the third-place boat in the third semifinal (who should have been eliminated) each had faster times than the winner of the first semifinal, the officials decided to hold another qualifying race. However, as the officials could not contact all of the teams involved, this race was scratched. 

The officials later decided to have a six-boat final, with the semifinal winners and the three fastest losers competing, despite the fact that the course had been designed for a maximum of four boats. As this decision was clearly preposterous, the semifinal winners boycotted the final in protest.

Following this fiasco, the officials decided to have a second final with the three semifinal winners plus the winner of the first final (Cercle de l'Aviron Roubaix) competing, which would have seen the first final become a de facto repechage: for this reason, as well as the fact they had already won the event under the rules in effect when the first final was held, the Cercle de l'Aviron Roubaix rowers flatly declined to compete in the second final.

Thus, the second final consisted only of the semifinal winners, resulting in two sets of medals being awarded for the event.

Schedule

Results

Semifinals

Initially, the top boat in each semifinal plus the runner-up in the third semifinal (which had four boats instead of the three boats competing in each of the other two), were to advance. Following protests which ensued after the runner-up in the second semifinal and the third-place boat in the third semifinal each posted better times than the winner of the first, the qualification rules for the final were altered. Eventually, the six boats were broken into two groups and competed in separate finals. The runners-up in semifinals 2 and 3 as well as the third-place boat in semifinal 3 competed in the first final, while the three semifinal winners competed in the second.

Semifinal 1

Semifinal 2

Semifinal 3

Finals

Final 1

Final 2

Results summary

References

External links
 International Olympic Committee medal winners database
 De Wael, Herman. Herman's Full Olympians: "Rowing 1900". Accessed 26 February 2006.
 

Rowing at the 1900 Summer Olympics